Crocus malyi, the Maly crocus, is a species of flowering plant in the genus Crocus of the family Iridaceae, endemic to Croatia.

In cultivation, it has gained the Royal Horticultural Society's Award of Garden Merit.

References

malyi
Plants described in 1871